La Gaucha is a 1920 Argentine silent film directed and written by José A. Ferreyra with Leopoldo Torres Ríos. The film premiered in Argentina on 27 April 1920.

Cast
Álvaro Escobar as  Lamento, el trovador del pago
Elena Guido as  Justiniana, la malquerida
Rosa Guido as  Juanita, la ardilla
María Halm as another victim
Jorge Lafuente as José María, el peón de campo
Lidia Liss as  Marga, la gaucha
Antonio Magatón as  Don Braulio, tata viejo
Yolanda de Maintenon as  Judith, la víctima
Enrique Parigi as  Ernesto Valvi, el hijo del patrón
Eduardo Leal Pizano as  Jorgito, el impecable
José Plá as  Don Pablo, el capataz
Elsa Rey ....  Rosita, la hija del capataz
Armando René Sentous ....  Juancho, el buen muchacho

References

External links
 

1920 films
1920s Spanish-language films
Argentine black-and-white films
Films directed by José A. Ferreyra
Argentine silent films